Paul Cardall (born April 24, 1973) is an American pianist known for his original compositions and arrangements of various hymns.  His music is frequently categorized as Classical, Christian and New Age. Cardall has had several recordings debut No. 1 on top Billboard charts. He was born with essentially half a functioning heart, which required immediate surgery when Cardall was less than a day old.
In addition to his recording career, Cardall founded Stone Angel Music in 1999, which produced a catalogue of recordings by other similar artists. The catalogue was acquired by Anthem Entertainment Group in 2018.

Personal life

After two more heart surgeries at ages 13 and 14, Cardall became a pianist.

Cardall was recruited by Salt Lake Community College (SLCC). He served as the Fine Arts President and Public Relations Vice-President at SLCC while enjoying a full-ride leadership scholarship there. During the summer season he worked as a youth counselor for the Especially for Youth camps at Brigham Young University.

While attending college, Cardall played piano for tips at a Nordstrom department store and local restaurants. He recorded his first album, Sign of Affection, in 1994. Richard Paul Evans, author of the best-seller The Christmas Box, heard the album and asked Cardall to create a musical adaptation of his story. Cardall was able to travel to national book signings with Evans during the release of the CD and the book, he was able to sell tens of thousands of copies of his album and developed a supportive fan base.

While Cardall continued to compose music part-time, he worked at Richard Paul Evans's book distribution company as the music executive. He worked with Disney, BMG, and others, and became interested in making piano performance his career.  Cardall's early compositions are influenced by Mozart, pianists David Lanz, George Winston, and Yanni.

Cardall knew that one day he would likely need a heart transplant.  He lived with congenital heart disease for over thirty years. He was born with only a single functioning ventricle or half-heart. In August 2008, with his heart failure, Cardall was listed for a heart transplant. After waiting 385 days, he received a donated heart via transplant on September 9, 2009.

Cardall is married to Kristina Molek, a former Wall Street analyst who is a first generation Slovenian American.

Career
In early 1999, Cardall founded Stone Angel Music, an independent record label intended to produce, market, and distribute Cardall's recordings.

That same year, Cardall signed a multi-album deal with Narada, an affiliate of Virgin Records. Cardall said he signed with Narada to help further distribution routes for his album The Christmas Box inspired by Richard Paul Evans #1 New York Times bestseller, which was originally released independently in 1997. Narada expanded upon the distribution channels Cardall had begun with author Richard Paul Evans. The Christmas Box album debuted #22 on Billboard's New Age Chart. That same year, Cardall also debuted a new album entitled The Looking Glass. In December 1999, both records were listed on Billboard's Top 25 New Age Charts.

During his association with The Christmas Box, families of victims in the Oklahoma City bombing requested the music be played during the memorial ceremonies as families placed flowers on the empty chairs representing their lost loved ones, covered by news channels including CNN. The event inspired Cardall to release Miracles: A Journey of Hope and Healing.

In September 2005, Cardall released a new CD called Primary Worship, inspired by the innocence and spiritual development of childhood. The album debuted at #12 on the Billboard Magazine Top 25 New Age Chart, spending 11 weeks on that chart.

Cardall released a collection of hymns arranged for piano in 2008 titled The Hymns Collection, which debuted No. 4 on the Billboard New Age charts.

That same year, Cardall released a two-disc titled Living for Eden.  Which is considered extremely personal and insightful as Eden is the name of his daughter, and music is his Eden-place; the way he finds his own peace and comfort.

In 2009, when Cardall's health was at its lowest, he recorded a CD titled Sacred Piano, putting together some of the most meaningful things he had done up to that point. The album debuted #5 on Billboard's New Age Chart.

In 2011, Cardall's album New Life debuted as the number one Billboard New Age album in February 2011. New Life held its rank in the top 5 albums for more than 30 weeks.

In 2013, the film Ephraim's Rescue was released with the music composed by Cardall.

In 2015, Cardall's album 40 Hymns for Forty Days (2015), debuted as the number one Billboard New Age album in March 2014.  40 Hymns for Forty Days held its high rank in the top 10 albums for more than 50 weeks.
Paul Cardall's A New Creation was released on September 16, 2016, by Stone Angel Music. The album debuted #1 on Billboard's New Age Album Chart, #2 Classical Album Chart, #12 Christian Album Chart, #34 overall Independent Albums, and #7 Heatseekers Chart.  The album features soloists Nathan Pacheco (Disney Pearl Records; Yanni Voices tour) and Patrice Tipoki (Fantine, Les Misérables international Broadway tour).

2018 Cardall produced two albums for Stone Angel Music. The first titled Worth of Souls brought together Christian artists performing songs to fight suicide, depression. The album debuted No. 12 Compilation Albums, No. 20 Christian Album Sales, and 47 Independent Album Sales, according to Billboard. The second album, Sunday, is a collection of works from various Stone Angel Music artists. The album debuted No. 1 on the Top New Age Albums Billboard Chart and No. 35 on the Christian Album Sales.

November 2, 2018, Christmas was released by Cardall, who generally produces his own albums. This time Jim Daneker produced the album. Christmas was recorded at Ocean Way Nashville. Christmas debuted No 1 on top Billboard's New Age Chart and No 2 in Classical. The Gospel Music Association awarded a Dove Award for Instrumental Album of The Year.

August 23, 2019, Peaceful piano was released by Anthem Entertainment Group, who acquired Stone Angel Music's catalogue a year early. Paul worked with multi-Grammy winning engineer Michael Bishop. Peaceful Piano is a collection of improvised piano solos reflecting on Paul's decade surviving with a donor heart.

December 3, 2020, Cardall was invited by Grammy nominated country artist Ty Herndon and Tony winning broadway star Kristin Chenoweth the join them on Orphans of God written by Joel Lindsay and Twila LaBar.

February 5, 2021 The Broken Miracle was released by Anthem Entertainment Group. Paul collaborated with several guest performers, including David Archuleta, Tyler Glenn, lead singer of Neon Trees, Grammy nominated Thompson Square, Grammy nominated country artist Ty Herndon, former Grammy nominated Sanctus Real lead singer Matt Hammitt, Grammy winner Rachael Yamagata, Akelee and J. Daniel, and Ty Herndon, among others.

December 3, 2021 December was released by Cardall and debuted No. 11 on the top Billboard Classical Crossover chart. Cardall offered a two versions of the recording, one master album of piano with a string ensemble and the other a solo piano version.

Albums

Charitable activities
Paul Cardall served on the Board of Governors for Operation Underground Railroad, a nonprofit founded by Tim Ballard which assists governments around the world in the rescue of human trafficking and sex trafficking victims, with a special focus on children.

The Paul & Kristina Cardall Scholarship was established with the help from Salt Lake Community College (SLCC), for students with congenital heart disease.

Paul Cardall has performed at benefit concerts for individuals who, like himself, are fighting for their chance to receive a heart transplant. At the beginning of summer 2014, Paul Cardall performed locally in Salt Lake City for a young boy who suffered from heart illness.

In 2011, Utah State Board of Regents awarded Paul Cardall with an honorary doctorate.

Stone Angel Music 
Stone Angel Music is an independent record label founded by Paul Cardall in 1999.

Stone Angel Music has released albums by Steven Sharp Nelson from The Piano Guys, Camille Nelson, Ryan Tilby, Shane Mickelsen, and Jason Lyle Black, had his album Preludes debut at No. 2 on the Billboard Top New Age Albums Chart in June 2016.

Pianist Jason Lyle Black's Piano Preludes, released May 6, 2016, recently debuted at No. 2 on the Billboard Top New Age Albums chart. According to Black, the honor is rare for an artist's first album and is a testament to Black's producer, Paul Cardall, and record label, Stone Angel Music.

References

External links

Facebook
 Stone Angel Music's Official Site Includes reviews, samples, track listings and complete liner notes. 
 Stone Angel Music Facebook

Living people
Narada Productions artists
1973 births
American male pianists
21st-century American pianists
21st-century American male musicians
People with congenital heart defects